Sigfrido Burmann or Siegfried Burmann (1891–1980) was a German-born Spanish art director. He was the father of Wolfgang Burmann, who also became an art director.

Selected filmography
 White Mission (1946)
 Ninety Minutes (1949)
 Wings of Youth (1949)
 Agustina of Aragon (1950)
 Lola the Coalgirl (1952)
 Father Cigarette (1955)
 Don Juan (1956)
 The Legion of Silence (1956)
 The Adventures of Gil Blas (1956)
 Melancholic Autumn (1958)
 Listen To My Song (1959)
 Lovely Memory (1961)
 The Two Little Rascals (1961)
 The Balcony of the Moon (1962)
 The Twin Girls (1963)
 Tomy's Secret (1963)

References

Bibliography
 Mira, Alberto. The Cinema of Spain and Portugal. Wallflower Press, 2005.

External links

1891 births
1980 deaths
German art directors
Spanish art directors
German emigrants to Spain
Film people from Hanover